His Majesty's Botanist is a member of the Royal household in Scotland.

The office was created in 1699, and from 1768 until 1956 it was combined with the office of Regius Keeper of the Royal Botanic Garden Edinburgh, who also held the post of Regius Professor of Botany at the University of Edinburgh. Since then the office of HM Botanist has been honorary, but conferred on a serving or retired Regius Keeper.

Office holders

 1699: James Sutherland
 1715: Dr William Arthur
 1716: Charles Alston
 1761: Dr John Hope
 1786: Daniel Rutherford MD
 1820: Robert Graham MD
 1845: John Hutton Balfour MD
 1880: Alexander Dickson MD LLD
 1888: Sir Isaac Bayley Balfour
 1922: Prof. Sir William Wright Smith (d 1956)
 1966: Harold Roy Fletcher (d 1978)
 1987: Prof. Douglas Mackay Henderson
 2010: Prof Stephen Blackmore

See also
Regius Keeper of the Royal Botanic Garden Edinburgh

References

Sources
 Holders from 1703 to 1820 from "Exchequer Establishment List" c.1770 (E/229/10/1) in National Archives of Scotland
 Royal Botanic Garden: A Brief History

Further reading
 Charles Alston
 Isaac Bayley Balfour

 
Scottish royalty
Lists of office-holders in Scotland
Positions within the British Royal Household
Royal Botanic Garden Edinburgh